Jim White (born November 22, 1944) is an American politician who served as a member of the South Dakota Senate for the 22nd district from 2013 to 2021. White served consecutively in the South Dakota Legislature from January 11, 2011, until January 8, 2013, in the South Dakota House of Representatives District 22 seat.

Elections
2012 When incumbent Senate District 22 Republican Senator Tom Hansen was term limited and left the District 22 seat open, White was unopposed for the June 5, 2012 Republican Primary and won the November 6, 2012 General election with 5,196 votes (54.4%) against Democratic nominee Chris Studer.
2010 To challenge House District 22 incumbent Democratic Representatives Quinten Burg and Peggy Gibson, White was unopposed for the June 8, 2010 Republican Primary; in the three-way November 2, 2010 General election, Representative Gibson took the first seat and White took the second seat with 4,526 votes (32.35%) ahead of Representative Burg; an election recount did not change the result.

References

External links
Official page at the South Dakota Legislature
Campaign site
 

Place of birth missing (living people)
Living people
Republican Party members of the South Dakota House of Representatives
People from Huron, South Dakota
Republican Party South Dakota state senators
1944 births
21st-century American politicians